Cola duparquetiana is a species of flowering plant in the family Malvaceae. It is found only in Gabon.

References

duparquetiana
Endemic flora of Gabon
Vulnerable flora of Africa
Taxa named by Henri Ernest Baillon
Taxonomy articles created by Polbot